Pelakot  is a village development committee in Syangja District in the Gandaki Zone of central Nepal. At the time of the 2011 Nepal census it had a population of 5748 people living in 1220 individual households.

References

pelakot is beautiful place  in syangja district.

External links
UN map of the municipalities of Syangja District

Populated places in Syangja District